Emmaline Henry (November 1, 1928 – October 8, 1979) was an American actress  best known for playing Amanda Bellows, the wife of Dr. Alfred Bellows, on the hit 1960s situation comedy I Dream of Jeannie.

Career

Henry first appeared during the first season of I Dream of Jeannie, 1965, episode #18, "Is There An Extra Genie In the House?" playing a magician's assistant named "Myrt". She then made 33 appearances as Amanda Bellows until the fifth and final season in 1970. 

Henry began her career as a singer, appearing on local radio in her teens. She went to Hollywood in the early 1950s and found her way into the choruses of several musicals. Producers began noticing, however, that her comic skills were superior to her singing. She toured in musicals like Top Banana, and later appeared in the film version of the show. She succeeded Carol Channing in the play Gentlemen Prefer Blondes.

Henry made her television debut in a 1955 episode of the ZIV production, I Led Three Lives. This was followed by appearances in another ZIV TV show, as a gun moll robber in Highway Patrol. She appeared on The Red Skelton Show in 1961 and, subsequently, made guest appearances on various sitcoms, including The Farmer's Daughter, The Munsters and Petticoat Junction.  Her first starring role was as John Astin's wife in I'm Dickens, He's Fenster. In 1964–65, she appeared as Mickey Rooney's wife, Nora, in the short-lived  sitcom Mickey and a guest appearance on Bonanza (1969).

She also made feature film appearances in Divorce American Style (1967), Rosemary's Baby (1968) and Harrad Summer (1974).

Following the cancellation of I Dream of Jeannie in 1970, Henry guest-starred on other sitcoms, including  Love, American Style, The Bob Newhart Show, and in the dramatic television mini-series Backstairs at the White House. In 1971 she guest-starred in the final episode of Green Acres playing Lillian Grant, the sister of Oliver's former secretary Carol Rush (Elaine Joyce). The episode was a backdoor pilot that was rejected by CBS. On Three's Company, she appeared  in the recurring role of Chrissy's boss, J.C. Braddock. Her final appearance was the Eight Is Enough episode "I Do, I Do, I Do, I Do ", which first aired on September 19, 1979, just 21 days before her death in October 1979.

Personal life 
Henry married actor Mark Roberts on November 1, 1969. They divorced in 1974.

Death
Henry died of a brain tumor on October 8, 1979, at the age of 50. She is interred at the Holy Cross Cemetery in Culver City, California.

Filmography

Movies

Television

References

External links
 

1928 births
1979 deaths
American film actresses
Deaths from brain cancer in the United States
American musical theatre actresses
American stage actresses
American television actresses
Actresses from Philadelphia
Burials at Holy Cross Cemetery, Culver City
Deaths from cancer in California
Neurological disease deaths in California
Musicians from Philadelphia
20th-century American actresses
20th-century American singers
Singers from Pennsylvania
20th-century American women singers